Guglielmo Verdirame, Baron Verdirame,  (born 25 August 1971) is a legal scholar, barrister and a member of the House of Lords. He is Professor of International Law at King's College London in the Department of War Studies and the School of Law. He was previously a Junior Research Fellow at Merton College, Oxford, a university lecturer in law at the University of Cambridge Faculty of Law, a Fellow of the Lauterpacht Centre for International Law, a visiting fellow at Harvard Law School, and a visiting professor at Columbia Law School. He is a dual national (British and Italian), and was born in Reggio di Calabria, Italy.

Education
He completed his secondary schooling at the United World College of the Adriatic. He graduated with a Doctor of Philosophy (PhD) from the London School of Economics and Political Science in 2001 with a thesis entitled "UN accountability for violations of human rights".

Career
He practises as a barrister at 20 Essex Street Chambers and was appointed Queen's Counsel (now King's Counsel) in January 2019.

Verdirame conducted empirical research on international organisations and refugee protection, which formed the basis of a series of articles and the book "Rights in Exile: Janus-faced Humanitarianism", which he co-authored with Barbara Harrell-Bond, an anthropologist whose "Imposing Aid" (1986) was a pioneering critique of international institutions and humanitarianism. While still relying on the earlier socio-legal and empirical research, Verdirame's "The UN and Human Rights: Who Guards the Guardians?" (2011) offers a predominantly doctrinal analysis of the accountability and responsibility of the UN. The book won the Biennial Book Award of the Friends of the Academic Council of the United Nations in 2014.

In addition to the law of international organisation, Verdirame has written on the use of force, the laws of war, trade and investment, international criminal law, and the philosophy of international law and human rights. He has argued that liberal internationalists have changed in the last decades, having embraced a supranationalist and cosmopolitan view of the international political order that gives little or no importance to the ideal of self-government and "is at odds with liberal internationalism properly understood". He is the author, with Oxford philosopher John Tasioulas, of the entry on international law in the Stanford Encyclopedia of Philosophy. He chose Niccolò Machiavelli's Discourses, Giambattista Vico's New Science, Guido De Ruggiero's History of European Liberalism, Antonio Gramsci's Prison Notebooks, Norberto Bobbio's Liberalism and Democracy for the Five Best Book series on the topic of Italian political philosophy.

Since 2006, Verdirame has been in practice at the Bar specialising in public international law. His practice includes both commercial  (e.g. investment arbitration) and more mainstream aspects of international law (e.g. inter-state disputes, immunity, human rights). He formed part of the UK Government legal team in Miller v. Secretary of State for Exiting the European Union (2017) 'the Article 50 case' at the Supreme Court, and was counsel for the United Kingdom at the International Court of Justice [Obligations concerning Negotiations relating to Cessation of the Nuclear Arms Race and to Nuclear Disarmament (Marshall Islands v. United Kingdom)], and for the Italian Republic in the Enrica Lexie case about the detention of two Italian marines by India following an incident where two Indian fishermen were killed off the coast of Kerala. He was also instructed] by Leigh Day on behalf of The United Nations special rapporteur in the Court of Appeal and Supreme Court case Shamima Begum v. Secretary of State for the Home Department. It was reported in March 2022 that Verdirame represented Ukraine against Russia in the European Court of Human Rights in a case filed in response to the Russian invasion.

Verdirame, who was a supporter of Brexit , wrote a number of papers during the Brexit debates in 2016-2019. He criticised the 2018 version of the Brexit withdrawal agreement negotiated under Theresa May arguing that the Northern Ireland "backstop would inevitably weaken the institutions of the Belfast Agreement
and their role in policy-making for Northern Ireland" but that there were ways of strengthening the UK's position. He also co-authored a proposal with Sir Richard Aikens and Professor George Yarrow for Britain to remain in the European Economic Area while a long-term arrangement was negotiated. He has spoken against Britain leaving the European Convention on Human Rights.

House of Lords
It was announced as part of the 2022 Special Honours that Verdirame would receive a life peerage. On 2 November 2022, he was created Baron Verdirame, of Belsize Park in the London Borough of Camden. He sits in the Lords as a non-affiliated peer.

Personal life 
Verdirame's partner is the Conservative Party political adviser Henry Newman.

References

Academics of the University of Cambridge
Alumni of the London School of Economics
University of Bologna alumni
Harvard Law School fellows
Alumni of Merton College, Oxford
21st-century Italian lawyers
Living people
Italian human rights activists
Academics of King's College London
People from Reggio Calabria
People educated at a United World College
Life peers created by Charles III
LGBT life peers
1971 births